The 2006 NCAA Division I Women's Lacrosse Championship was the 25th annual single-elimination tournament to determine the national champion of Division I NCAA women's college lacrosse. The championship game was played at Nickerson Field in Boston, Massachusetts during May 2006. All NCAA Division I women's lacrosse programs were eligible for this championship, and a total of 16 teams were invited to participate.

Northwestern defeated Dartmouth, 7–4, to win their second national championship. This would subsequently become the second of Northwestern's seven national titles in eight years (2005–2009, 2011–12).

The leading scorer for the tournament was Crysti Foote from Notre Dame (17 goals). Sarah Albrecht, from Northwestern, was named the tournament's Most Outstanding Player.

Qualification
A total of 16 teams were invited to participate. 10 teams qualified automatically by winning their conference tournaments while the remaining 6 teams qualified at-large based on their regular season records.

Play-in game

Teams

Tournament bracket

All-tournament team 
Whitney Douthett, Dartmouth
Sarah Szeefi, Dartmouth
Devon Wills, Dartmouth
Kristen Zimmer, Dartmouth
Laura Anderson, Duke
Katie Chrest, Duke
Sarah Albrecht, Northwestern (Most outstanding player)
Lindsay Finocchiaro, Northwestern
Aly Josephs, Northwestern
Kristen Kjellman, Northwestern
Morgan Lathrop, Northwestern
Crysti Foote, Notre Dame
Becky Ranck, Notre Dame

See also 
 NCAA Division II Women's Lacrosse Championship 
 NCAA Division III Women's Lacrosse Championship
 2006 NCAA Division I Men's Lacrosse Championship

References

NCAA Division I Women's Lacrosse Championship
NCAA Division I Women's Lacrosse Championship
NCAA Women's Lacrosse Championship